Lecithocera isomitra is a moth in the family Lecithoceridae. It was described by Edward Meyrick in 1914. It is found in Malawi.

The wingspan is 13–14 mm. The forewings are dark violet slaty grey and the hindwings are grey.

References

Moths described in 1914
isomitra